The 2009 Espinar bus crash occurred in Espinar (near Cuzco), Peru, on 24 December 2009, when a bus rolled over the edge of a cliff, killing 41 and injuring 22.

The bus had been transporting passengers between the provinces of Arequipa and Chumbivilcas in Southern Peru. While travelling a mountain road in the Andean Mountains along the Altoandiana highway, the bus veered off the road and plunged down a 200-metre ravine. The cause was believed to be a wet road due to heavy rains, technical failure, and speeding. 40 passengers were found dead, and 22 were injured, one fatally. 10 of the injured were taken to a hospital in Espinar and 12 were taken to a hospital in Velille. One of the injured later died in the hospital.

2009 road incidents
2009 in Peru
Bus incidents in Peru
December 2009 events in South America